The 2020 Arizona Senate elections took place as part of the biennial 2020 United States elections. Arizona voters will elect state senators in all of the state's 30 senate districts. State senators serve two-year terms in the Arizona Senate, with all of the seats up for election each cycle. The primary elections on August 4, 2020, determined which candidates appeared on the November 3, 2020, general election ballot.

Following the previous election in 2018, Republicans had control of the Arizona Senate with 17 seats to Democrats' 13 seats.

Overview

Predictions

Summary

Closest races 
Seats where the margin of victory was under 10%:

Results

District 1

District 2

District 3

District 4

District 5

District 6

District 7

District 8

District 9

District 10

District 11

District 12

District 13

District 14

District 15

District 16

District 17

District 18

District 19

District 20

District 21

District 22

District 23

District 24

District 25

District 26

District 27

District 28

District 29

District 30

Outgoing incumbents

Retiring
Five incumbent senators are not seeking re-election in 2020, leaving five open seats.
 Andrea Dalessandro (D–Green Valley), representing District 2 since 2014, is term limited and running for a seat in the Arizona House of Representatives.
 Frank Pratt (R–Casa Grande), representing District 8 since 2017, is running to retake his seat in the Arizona House of Representatives.
 David Bradley (D–Tucson), representing District 10 since 2013 and serving as Minority Leader since 2019, has announced that he is not seeking re-election.
 Eddie Farnsworth (R–Gilbert), representing District 12 since 2018, announced his intention to retire from the Legislature in August 2019.
 David Farnsworth (R–Mesa), representing District 16 since 2013, will not be seeking re-election.

See also
 2020 Arizona House of Representatives election
 2020 United States elections
 2020 Arizona Democratic presidential primary
 2020 United States Senate election in Arizona
 2020 United States House of Representatives elections in Arizona
 Arizona Senate
 Elections in Arizona

References

External links
 

Senate
Arizona Senate elections
Arizona Senate